Marina de Tavira Servitje (born 21 November 1974) is a Mexican actress. She is internationally known for her role in the film Roma (2018), which received widespread acclaim and earned her an Academy Award nomination.

Life and career
She studied acting at the Casa del Teatro, the Nucleus of Theater Studies, and the San Cayetano Theater Training Center. Her first job after graduating was acting in the play  Feliz nuevo siglo doktor Freud (Happy New Century, Doktor Freud) by Sabina Berman. Marina de Tavira's father, a high official in the Mexican criminal justice system, was murdered in 2000, a day before her acting debut in Berman's play. Luis Rosales, a casting director at Netflix, was at this debut and later asked her to participate in Alfonso Cuarón's film Roma.

She is part of the Casa del Teatro teachers college. She is a member and founder, along with Enrique Singer, of the Incidente Teatro production company with which they have premiered Betrayal by Harold Pinter, Crimes of the Heart by Beth Henley, La mujer justa by Hugo Urquijo (based on the novel by Sándor Márai), and The Anarchist by David Mamet.

She has participated in more than 25 productions such as Seven Doors.

In 2019, she was nominated for the Academy Award for Best Supporting Actress for her role as the character Sofía in Roma, alongside Amy Adams, Regina King, Emma Stone and Rachel Weisz in the same category. After this nomination, she returned to the theater in the play Skylight, at her alma mater, the Casa del Teatro in Mexico City.

Personal life

Family 
Her grandfather Lorenzo Servitje is the founder of Grupo Bimbo, and her uncle Daniel Servitje is the current CEO. 

Tavira's maternal history is linked to Juan Servitje Torrallardona, a Catalan who came to Mexico in 1904. He would open the El Molino pastry shop, which would remain in the hands of his son Lorenzo. Juan had seven children. One of them, María Lucila Isabel Servitje Montull, served as a teacher in theology and director of the Mexican Institute of Christian Social Doctrine. María married Tavira, with whom she had three children, including Marina.

Marina de Tavira's father, Juan Pablo de Tavira Noriega, was a prominent Mexican crimonologist, a lawyer, and the first director of Mexico's Altiplano Prison, overseeing such high-security prison inmates as Joaquín "El Chapo" Guzmán, Rafael Caro Quintero, Mario Aburto Martínez and Miguel Ángel Félix Gallardo. After multiple death threats, Juan Pablo was murdered under mysterious circumstances in November 2000.

Marina de Tavira is the niece of the theater director Luis de Tavira and the actress Rosa María Bianchi; she is the cousin of Pedro de Tavira Egurrola and José María de Tavira.

From 2012 to 2019, she had a relationship with Mexican actor Rafael Sánchez Navarro. From 2019 to 2021, she had a relationship with Mexican actor Diego Luna.

De Tavira has maintained a private personal life; she has one child.

Filmography

Awards & nominations

References

External links 
 
 

Ariel Award winners
Living people
Actresses from Mexico City
20th-century Mexican actresses
21st-century Mexican actresses
1974 births
Mexican people of Catalan descent